Presliophytum is a genus of flowering plants belonging to the family Loasaceae.

It is native to Peru, Chile and north-western Argentina.
 
The genus name of Presliophytum is in honour of Carl Borivoj Presl (1794–1852), a Czech botanist. The -phytum part of the name refers to phyte meaning 'plant'. It was first described and published in Taxon Vol.55 on page 467 in 2006.

Known species
According to Kew:
Presliophytum arequipense 
Presliophytum heucherifolium 
Presliophytum incanum 
Presliophytum malesherbioides 
Presliophytum sessiliflorum

References

Loasaceae
Cornales genera
Plants described in 2006
Flora of Peru
Flora of Chile
Flora of Northwest Argentina